The 2020 Ice Speedway of Nations was the 42nd edition of the FIM's Ice Speedway World Championship for national teams. The event was held in Wilmersdorf, Berlin, Germany.

Russia won their 18th consecutive world title and also won the title for the 38th time (including Soviet Union) during the 42 years that the championships have been held.

Final Classification

See also 
 Ice racing
 Ice Speedway of Nations
 Individual Ice Speedway World Championship

References 

Ice speedway competitions
World